Port of Brisbane Motorway is a motorway which connects the Port of Brisbane to the Gateway Motorway. Stage 1 was opened in December 2002. The motorway was built to take freight traffic off Lytton Road, with about 4,000 vehicles travelling to the Port of Brisbane in 2002. Stage 1 cost A$196 million and was finished six months ahead of schedule and A$20 million under budget. The Port of Brisbane Motorway holds the M4 motorway designation.

Stage 2 includes a three kilometre extension of the existing motorway through to Pritchard Street. Construction commenced in April 2011 with completion in February 2013.
The project was named Port Connect, an A$385 million upgrade.

A further stage of upgrade was completed on the connecting roads to the port. The project was named Port Drive Upgrade, an A$110 million upgrade from the eastern end of the Port of Brisbane Motorway through to Port Gate. Construction commenced in Q3 2016 and completed mid 2018. It included duplication of Port Drive, an overpass at Kite Street intersection and duplication of Lucinda Drive.

Interchanges
The entire motorway is in the City of Brisbane local government area.

Road diagram
The accompanying diagram shows the interchanges with and overpasses of the Port of Brisbane Motorway.

Gallery

See also

 Freeways in Australia
 Freeways in Brisbane

References

Highways in Queensland
Roads in Brisbane
Transport infrastructure completed in 2002
2002 establishments in Australia